Robert Brown (born March 11, 1984) is an American actor. He is known for his roles in the films Finding Forrester (2000), Coach Carter (2005), Take the Lead (2006), and The Express: The Ernie Davis Story (2008), and for starring in the HBO series Treme (2010–13).

Early life
Brown was born in Harlem, New York on March 11, 1984, the middle of three children. Brown's mother works as a substance abuse counselor. He was raised in Brooklyn. Brown attended Poly Prep Country Day School and Prep for Prep, where he played on the school's football team as a wide receiver. He graduated from Amherst College, where he balanced his education and acting career. Prior to being cast in Finding Forrester, Brown's only acting experience was a school play during childhood.

Career
When he turned 16, Brown auditioned for Finding Forrester, expecting to be cast as an extra. However, the film's director Gus Van Sant claimed Brown was the actor he was seeking to portray high school basketball player Jamal Wallace, and cast him in the role. Brown made his acting debut in the 2000 film, opposite Sean Connery. Brown received positive reviews in his first acting role. One critic believed Brown shined more than his veteran co-star. A film reviewer stated Brown held his own "remarkably well" alongside Connery, with a third opining the two actors had an "appealing chemistry."

In 2005, he played the role of basketball player Kenyon Stone in the drama film Coach Carter, starring Samuel L. Jackson. Reviewer A. O. Scott opined Brown had a "strong" showing in the movie. The following year, he appeared as a high school student Jason "Rock" Rockwell in the dance film Take the Lead, starring Antonio Banderas and Alfre Woodard. Brown portrayed football player Ernie Davis in The Express: The Ernie Davis Story (2008).

Brown landed his first television role as jazz musician Delmond Lambreaux on drama series Treme in 2010. He continued portraying the character until the show ended in 2013. Brown was cast in the NBC drama Blindspot (2015−20) as FBI Special Agent Edgar Reade. He appeared as Bobby in Don Jon (2013) and played the role of Bryce in Criminal Activities (2015). In 2022, Brown recurred as Maurice Ward in miniseries We Own This City.

Personal life

Racial Profiling Lawsuit
In 2013, Brown was arrested for allegedly purchasing a watch for his mother with a "fake" credit card at Macy's in New York City. He was later released with no charges against him, due to the fact that the American Express credit card was actually his. Evidently, Macy's staff had become suspicious (possibly due to the cost of the watch, his age and/or his ethnicity) but had not taken basic steps to check the validity of the credit card with American Express or cross-check against his driving licence. Subsequently, CNN reported that the actor had "reached a “settlement in principle” in his racial profiling lawsuits against Macy’s and New York, according to court documents and a statement from the retailer."

Filmography

Film

Television

Video games

References

External links

Place of birth missing (living people)
1984 births
Living people
African-American male actors
American male film actors
Amherst College alumni
20th-century American male actors
21st-century American male actors
American male child actors
American male television actors
American male voice actors
Poly Prep alumni
20th-century African-American people
21st-century African-American people